Mulla may refer to:

Places 
River Awbeg, in Ireland
Mulla, Afghanistan
Mollakənd, Kurdamir, Azerbaijan

Other uses 
 Mullah, a title for an Islamic cleric
 Mulla (surname), including a list of people with the name
 Mulla (film), a 2008 Malayalam film
 Camp Mulla, a Kenyan hip hop group

See also 
 Mula (disambiguation)